The 1996 international cricket season was from April 1996 to September 1996.

Season overview

May

India in England

July

Pakistan in England

August

Singer World Series Cup 1996

September

Zimbabwe in Sri Lanka

Sahara Cup 1996

References

1997 in cricket